Fame Academy is a British television programme that ran for two series, in 2002 and 2004. The show was produced for the BBC in a reality television format. The winners of the show, David Sneddon and Alex Parks, were awarded music recording contracts to allow them to release music and live like top recording artists for a year. Sneddon had a run of three top-20 hits, including his debut single "Stop Living the Lie", which peaked at number one on the UK Singles Chart in January 2003.
David Sneddon signed to major music publisher Sony/ATV Music Publishing in 2009 as a songwriter.
Parks' debut single "Maybe That's What It Takes" charted at number three in November 2003.

In addition to Sneddon and Parks, several other contestants have gone on to have successful music careers, while others were given record deals and released several songs before leaving the music industry. The runner-up from the first series, Sinéad Quinn, signed a record deal with Mercury Records, the same company as Sneddon, and released her debut single "I Can't Break Down" in February 2003. The song charted at number two on the UK Singles Chart. Her second single, "What You Need Is..." peaked in top 20 in June 2003. Ainslie Henderson's debut, and thus far only single "Keep Me a Secret" ranked number five in February 2003. Malachi and Alistair Griffin released self-penned songs in 2003 but were subsequently dropped from their record labels. James Fox was chosen as the United Kingdom's representative for the 2004 Eurovision Song Contest; he sang "Hold Onto Our Love", which charted at number 13 on the UK Singles Chart in April 2003, and received 29 points for his performance.

Lemar, who finished in third place in the first series, has been the most successful contestant from the show. He released his first single, "Dance (With U)", which charted at number-two on the UK Singles Chart, in August 2003; he has since recorded nine further top 40 hit singles, including six that charted in the top 10. He has released four studio albums; The Truth About Love is the most successful, charting at number three on the UK Albums Chart in 2006.

As of March 2014, Fame Academy contestants have released 28 charting singles and 10 charting albums. Of the 20 singles that reached the top twenty, 13 were top-ten hits. Eight of the twelve releases peaked inside the top 20. Lemar is the only artist who is still releasing music.

Singles

Albums
Only albums that charted in the Top 100 of the UK albums chart are included in this list.

Fame Academy albums
At the end of both series, a compilation album was released featuring cover versions from the contestants. The first album reached number two on the UK Compilation Chart. A third album, Bee Gees Special, was released during the show's broadcast and featured cover versions of Bee Gees songs.

Other releases
 Alistair Griffin released a cover version of "Hallelujah" called "Hallelujah Mark Viduka" through iTunes.
 Malachi Cush has released four further albums that have failed to chart: Celtic Heartbeat (Where the Heart Is) (2005) and Two Sides of Malachi and New Day (both 2007) and Timeless (2009).
 James Fox released an EP entitled Six Strings and an album that failed to chart called Rocking Chairs and Lemonade. He released a single "Higher" in 2008.
 Alex Parks released "Looking for Water" as a download-only single but the song only peaked at number 250.
 Peter Brame released an album, My Secret Suicide, in 2008, but it failed to chart.

See also

 Popstars (UK) discography
 Pop Idol discography

Notes
 Bluebirds Flying High was recorded by James Fox with Cardiff City F.C. as the club's official song for the 2008 FA Cup Final.

 Alistair Griffin recorded "My Lover's Prayer" with Robin Gibb, who had appeared as a guest judge on Fame Academy.

References
General
 [ allmusic (((Alistair Griffin > Discography)))]
 [ allmusic (((Alex Parks > Discography)))]
 [ allmusic (((David Sneddon > Discography)))]
 [ allmusic (((Sinéad Quinn > Discography)))]
 [ allmusic (((Lemar > Discography)))]
 [ allmusic (((James Fox > Discography)))]
 [ allmusic (((Malachi Cush > Discography)))]
 [ allmusic (((Ainslie Henderson > Discography)))]

Specific

External links
 Fame Academy imdb profile
 Details on the contestants

Fame Academy
British reality television series
Fame Academy